Roland Anthony Pearce (born 19 June 1930 in Singapore) is a former cricketer who played first-class cricket in South Africa in 1956 and 1957.

Roland Pearce made a spectacular start to his brief first-class career. Early in the 1956–57 South African cricket season he replaced Paul Randles, who had been Natal's regular wicketkeeper since 1952–53, in the Natal team for the friendly match against Western Province. Pearce took seven catches and a stumping and, opening Natal's innings with Trevor Goddard, made 95 and put on 163 for the first wicket. He was immediately selected to keep wicket for the South African XI that played the touring MCC a week later. The South African XI won, but Pearce failed with the bat and made no dismissals. He played just four more matches for Natal over that season and the next.

References

External links

1930 births
Living people
South African cricketers
KwaZulu-Natal cricketers
Singaporean emigrants to South Africa